Tylomelania palicolarum is a species of freshwater snail with an operculum, an aquatic gastropod mollusk in the family Pachychilidae.

The specific name palicolarum is according to the Latin words "pile" that means "pile" and Latin word "colus". The specific name refer to stilt houses that were built around the lake.

Distribution 
This species occurs in Malili lakes, Sulawesi, Indonesia. It occur in the single lake and the type locality is the lake Towuti.

Description 
The shell has 6-8 whorls.

The width of the shell is 25 mm. The height of the shell is 73 mm. The width of the aperture is 13.5 mm. The height of the aperture is 23 mm.

There are 6-7 concentric lines on the operculum.

References

External links 
 von Rintelen T. & Glaubrecht M. (2005). "Anatomy of an adaptive radiation: a unique reproductive strategy in the endemic freshwater gastropod Tylomelania (Cerithioidea: Pachychilidae) on Sulawesi, Indonesia and its biogeographical implications." Biological Journal of the Linnean Society 85: 513–542. .

palicolarum
Gastropods described in 1897